Metaepistemology is the branch of epistemology and metaphilosophy that studies the underlying assumptions made in debates in epistemology, including those concerning the existence and authority of epistemic facts and reasons, the nature and aim of epistemology, and the methodology of epistemology. 

Perspectives in methodological debates include traditional epistemology which argues for the use of intuitions and for the autonomy of epistemology from science, experimental philosophy which argues against intuitions and for the use of empirical studies in epistemology, pragmatism which argues for the reconstruction of epistemic concepts to achieve practical goals, naturalism which argues that epistemology should be empirical and scientifically-informed, and feminism which criticises androcentric bias in epistemology and argues for the use of feminist method.

Terminology 
According to philosopher Dominique Kuenzle, metaepistemology is not an established term in contemporary philosophy, only having been used by a few philosophers throughout the twentieth and twenty-first century after being coined by Roderick Firth in a 1959 article discussing the views of Roderick Chisholm on the ethics of belief. In 1968, Richard Brandt used the term in an entry in the Encyclopedia of Philosophy to refer to a higher-order discipline in epistemology, analogous to metaethics, which attempts to explain epistemic concepts and to understand the underlying "logic" of epistemic statements. In 1978, similarly inspired by the work of Roderick Chisholm, William Alston released "Meta-Ethics and Meta-Epistemology", the first paper with the explicit aim of defining the distinction between metaepistemology and "substantive" epistemology, in which he defined metaepistemology as the study of "the conceptual and methodological foundations of [epistemology]." Whilst subsequent theorists using the term have agreed on the need for a distinction between metaepistemology and other areas of epistemology, there are substantial disagreements about how and where to draw the lines. Kuenzle describes three different conceptions of metaepistemology that have been used in the philosophical literature: metaepistemology as the epistemology of epistemology, metaepistemology as the examination of epistemology's goals, methods and criteria of adequacy, and metaepistemology as the study of the semantic, epistemic and pragmatic status of epistemic statements and judgements.

The Blackwell Dictionary of Western Philosophy defines metaepistemology as the "epistemology of epistemology" and states that it "analyzes basic epistemic concepts, determining their limits and the conditions of their application." The Cambridge Dictionary of Philosophy characterises metaepistemology as a branch of metaphilosophy which "studies the goals, methods, and fundamental assumptions of [epistemology]." The Routledge Encyclopedia of Philosophy defines metaepistemology as "the study of the nature, aims, methods and legitimacy of epistemology" whilst the anthologies Metaepistemology: Realism and Anti-Realism and Metaepistemology respectively define it as "the branch of epistemology that asks questions about the existence, nature and authority of epistemic facts and reasons" and "the metaphysics, epistemology, psychology, and language of epistemology." Similarly, the Internet Encyclopedia of Philosophy defines metaepistemology as inquiring into "fundamental aspects of epistemic theorizing like metaphysics, epistemology, semantics, agency, psychology, responsibility, reasons for belief, and beyond." The Stanford Encyclopedia of Philosophy states that metaepistemology "takes a step back from particular substantive debates in epistemology in order to inquire into the assumptions and commitments made by those who engage in these debates."

Relationship to epistemology 
The division between metaepistemology and the other branches of epistemology as well as their connections with one another are debated by metaepistemologists. Some theorists, such as William Alston, characterise metaepistemology as dealing with the analysis of epistemic concepts such as knowledge. Dominique Kuenzle has criticised Alston for such a view, saying that questions such as what condition separates knowledge from true belief are "as paradigmatically epistemological in character as anybody could wish for". Similarly, Christos Kyriacou says that the analysis of knowledge is "first-order normative epistemological theorizing at its best" which he contrasts with his view of metaepistemology as necessarily second-order in nature. Theorists also differ on whether the debate between internalism and externalism is epistemological or metaepistemological. 

As well as the question of where the dividing line between metaepistemology and the rest of epistemology should be placed, there are also differing views about what branches to divide epistemology into. The Blackwell Dictionary of Western Philosophy contrasts metaepistemology with "substantive epistemology" whereas the Internet Encyclopedia of Philosophy states that epistemology can be divided into three branches analogously to the three branches of ethics: metaepistemology, normative epistemology and applied epistemology. Richard Fumerton views the idea of a branch of normative epistemology as problematic because he views epistemic normativity as inherently differing from the normativity paradigmatic of morality and prudential reasoning; he instead divides epistemology into metaepistemology and applied epistemology.

Views about the relationship between metaepistemology and the other branches of epistemology fall into two groups: autonomy and interdependency. According to the autonomy view, metaepistemology is an entirely independent branch of epistemology that neither depends on the other branches nor entails any particular position in the other branches. For example, according to this view, a person being an epistemic realist, anti-realist, or relativist has no implications for whether they should be a coherentist, foundationalist, or reliabilist and vice versa. According to the interdependency view, on the other hand, there are strong theoretical interdependencies between the branches and a normative epistemological view may even be fully derivable from a metaepistemological one.

Epistemological methodology 

Overall, traditional accounts of epistemological methodology hold that epistemological inquiry is a priori and so methods should be reflective rather than empirical, that epistemology is methodologically and conceptually autonomous from scientific methodology, and that epistemology is not just a descriptive discipline, but also a normative one as well. Another part of traditional methodology is the use of intuitions to make judgements about thought experiments which has arguably been a central part of philosophical methodology dating back to Plato; a famous example of its use in epistemology is the use of epistemologists intuitive responses to cases such as Gettier cases to determine the validity or invalidity of different theories of knowledge. Defenders of traditional epistemological methodology include Laurence BonJour, Ernest Sosa, Timothy Williamson and George Bealer. BonJour and Bealer have both argued that methodologies that reject a priori inquiry are self-defeating because their proponents must make arguments for why the rejection of a priori inquiry is preferable to traditional epistemology and, prior to the adoption of one methodology over the other, the only way to judge which is better is with the use of a priori judgements about which set of arguments are better. As BonJour summarises the argument, "the repudiation of all a priori justification is apparently tantamount to the repudiation of argument or reasoning generally, thus amounting in effect to intellectual suicide."

The use of intuitive judgements in traditional epistemological methodology has been criticised due to empirical results coming from the field of experimental philosophy which have aimed to cast doubt on this and other kinds of philosophical methodology which experimental philosophers view as "armchair methodology". Studies in experimental philosophy have suggested that intuitive judgements are unreliable because they are unstable and because they are sensitive to philosophically irrelevant factors such as cultural background and personality. They have also attempted to show that philosopher's intuitions misrepresent the folk intuitions of society at large. Proponents of the use of intuition in epistemology have questioned the design of these studies and put forwards their own empirical results. However, with the increasing professionalization of experimental philosophy, such arguments have fallen out of favour. Proponents have also attempted to argue that these experimental results are compatible with existing philosophical methodology. For example, one response to these results has been that folk judgements about philosophical thought experiments are subject to cognitive bias and that they are less reliable than the intuitions of professional philosophers who have a higher level of expertise in the subject area. Subsequent studies have shown that some of the earlier results in experimental philosophy such as the instability of intuitive judgements and their sensitivity to philosophically irrelevant factors affect professional philosophers to a similar degree as lay people and that professional philosophers are also subject to cognitive biases. Another argument that has been put forward by Max Deutsch and Herman Cappelen is that, contrary to the claims of experimental philosophers, examination of the philosophical literature reveals that thought experiments in philosophy actually don't rely on intuitive judgements but rather on judgements which are supported by philosophical arguments.

In response to this debate, Jonathan Weinberg has argued that one reason epistemologists have defended an intuition-driven methodology is because these results from experimental philosophy do not provide an alternative methodology to be used in its place. In order to strengthen the case against intuition-driven methodology, Weinberg proposes an alternative methodology which he calls "reconstructive neopragmatism" and compares it to intuition-driven methodology by how well they each meet up to several desirable methodological qualities including truth-conduciveness and the ability to produce normative results, the two most important qualities according to Weinberg. Weinberg argues that the biggest failures of intuition-driven methodology is that it doesn't foster successful conversations because intuitions are entirely subjective and cannot be rationally argued for or against and that it seems to imply epistemic relativism due to varying intuitions across cultures. Weinberg's reconstructive neopragmatism replaces intuitions with an “analysis-by-imagined-reconstruction” in which epistemologists continually evaluate and re-evaluate how epistemic norms and concepts should be changed to best achieve practical goals such as organising our lives. Weinberg claims that an advantage to this pragmatist methodology over intuition-driven methodology is that it allows for progressive change as epistemic circumstances change across time.

Another alternative to traditional epistemological methodology in epistemology is methodological naturalism, advocated for by Willard Quine, Hilary Kornblith and Alvin Goldman. Methodological naturalism was first explicitly proposed by Quine as part of his project to naturalize epistemology. Quine argued for the radical position that traditional epistemological methods had failed to deliver the results they had aimed for (such as an adequate response to the problem of induction) and as a result they should be abandoned and completely replaced with empirical psychology, a view which has since become known as "replacement naturalism". Kornblith and Goldman adopted more moderate forms of naturalism which allow for a place for epistemology but one that is informed by developments in science rather than being an entirely autonomous discipline. According to Kornblith, the subject matter of epistemology is not our concept of knowledge but the real and robust phenomenon of knowledge itself which, according to Kornblith, is a natural kind and this means that investigation into knowledge is a posteriori, not a priori. According to Kornblith, whilst philosophers' intuitions may be able to identify features of the shared concept of knowledge, the concept itself may be incorrect about the true nature of knowledge and so investigation in epistemology should use empirical methods just like investigation into any other external phenomenon in science. Kornblith further argues that epistemological methodology should be empirical rather than intuition-based because intuitions are historically conditioned and slow to change when new evidence is found. Goldman offered an even more moderate view which places appeals to intuition as an ineliminable part of epistemological methodology because even if we engage in empirical study of knowledge, we need some concept of what counts as knowledge in the first place. Despite this, his methodology is still naturalistic because it rejects the idea that justification is a concept that can be analysed into its necessary and sufficient conditions via intuitive judgements, instead identifying it with an entirely psychological process, and because he views scientific research as necessarily informing what actual psychological processes could count as justification once an adequate conceptualisation of it has been found.

Feminist philosophy has extended various of these criticisms of traditional epistemology from a feminist perspective and advocated for feminist methods in epistemology. For example, Sally Haslanger has argued from a pragmatist feminist perspective that androcentric bias is widespread within epistemic practice and concepts and as such the use that they provide for us should be re-evaluated so that they can be reformed to better serve their purposes within epistemology. Louise Antony and Elizabeth Anderson have embraced feminist forms of naturalist methodology which maintain naturalism's dedication to an empirical approach whilst making a space for normative feminist ideals such as eliminating androcentric bias. Antony argues that the "bias of paradox"—the tension between feminism's criticism of the bias in androcentric perspectives on the one hand and the feminist idea that all methods, including feminist methods, must be biased by their values and interests on the other—can be resolved by naturalism. She argues that feminists should not attempt to argue from a neutral perspective but should show through empirical work that feminist values and approaches are better at producing true theories than androcentric ones.

Metanormativity 

Epistemic language often includes sentences with a normative appearance; for example "you should believe in the evidence" or "it is good to be an open-minded researcher". This normative appearance of epistemic language gives rise to many metanormative questions such as whether epistemic semantics is truly normative, whether or not there are objective epistemic facts about what we ought to believe, how we could ever gain knowledge of such facts as well as whether or not they could fit into a naturalistic philosophy, and the relationship between epistemology and ethics as normative disciplines.

As in meta-ethics, views about the semantics of epistemology can be divided into cognitivism and non-cognitivism. Epistemic cognitivism holds that epistemic judgements such as "you should believe in the evidence" express beliefs about facts about the world and so characteristically aim at the truth. Epistemic non-cognitivism, on the other hand, holds that such judgements do not express beliefs, instead expressing the desires or attitudes of the speaker, and so are not truth-apt. 

Likewise, views about the metaphysics of epistemology can be divided into epistemic realism and anti-realism. Epistemic realism is the view that mind-independent epistemic facts, reasons and properties exist. Epistemic realism generally also holds that epistemic facts provide categorical reasons for belief (i.e. reasons that apply to agents regardless of their desires or goals). Epistemic anti-realism denies the existence of such epistemic facts, reasons and properties, instead characterising them as mind-dependent, and argues that mind-dependent facts provide us with only with instrumental reasons (i.e. reasons that only apply to agents depending on their desires and goals). Anti-realist theories are generally thought to fit well with naturalist philosophy because they ground normative epistemic facts in descriptive natural facts such as facts about human psychology. A view which seeks to find a middle ground between realism and anti-realism is constructivism (also known as constitutivism) which argues that normative truths are constructed by agents such that epistemic facts are grounded by or constitutive of facts about agents (such as facts about their desires or about the pre-conditions of their agency).

There are broadly two positions about the relationship between metaepistemology and metaethics: the parity thesis and the disparity thesis. The parity thesis holds that because metaethics and metaepistemology have important structural similarities to one another, their answers to metanormative questions such as whether there are any normative facts will be the same. For example, according to the parity thesis, if epistemic realism is true, then moral realism must also be true. The parity thesis has been used in "companions-in-guilt" arguments which aim to extend arguments for or against realism in metaepistemology to metaethics, and vice versa. For example, Terence Cuneo has argued that denying the existence of epistemic facts is self-defeating because it requires arguing that we should believe that there are no facts about what we should believe. According to this argument, there must be epistemic facts and, given the parity premise, also moral facts. Similarly utilising the parity premise, Sharon Street, Allan Gibbard and Matthew Chrisman have argued that reasons for being moral anti-realists extend to epistemic anti-realism. In contrast to the parity thesis, the disparity thesis holds that there is some important disparity between metaethics and metaepistemology which means that their answers to metanormative questions could be very different from one another. For example, Chris Heathwood argues that moral facts are irreducibly normative whilst epistemic facts are reducible to descriptive facts such as facts about evidence and probability. As a result, he thinks that we have reason to be moral realists but not necessarily epistemic realists.

References

Citations

Sources 
 

 
 
 
 

 
 

 
 *

External links 

Epistemology
Metaphilosophy